Anoba is a genus of moths of the family Erebidae. The genus was previously classified in the subfamily Calpinae of the family Noctuidae, but now is classified as part of the subfamily Anobinae, of which Anoba is the type genus.

Species
Anoba angulilinea (Holland 1894)
Anoba atriplaga (Walker 1858)
Anoba atripuncta (Hampson 1902)
Anoba biangulata (Walker 1869)
Anoba carcassoni Berio 1971
Anoba cowani Viette 1966
Anoba crucilla (Schaus 1914)
Anoba disjuncta (Walker 1865)
Anoba dujardini Viette 1970
Anoba excurvata Gaede 1939
Anoba firmalis (Guenée 1854)
Anoba flavilinea Hampson 1926
Anoba glyphica (Bethune-Baker 1911)
Anoba hamifera (Hampson 1902)
Anoba jaculifera (Holland 1894)
Anoba kampfi Berio 1971
Anoba ligondesi Viette 1970
Anoba lunifera (Hampson 1894)
Anoba malagasy Viette 1970
Anoba microloba Hampson 1926
Anoba microphaea Hampson 1926
Anoba nigribasis (Holland 1894)
Anoba noda (Swinhoe 1899)
Anoba pectinata (Hampson 1896)
Anoba phaeotermesia Hampson 1926
Anoba piriformis Gaede 1939
Anoba plumipes (Wallengren 1860)
Anoba pohli (Felder & Rogenhofer 1874)
Anoba polyspila (Walker 1865)
Anoba rigida (Swinhoe 1895)
Anoba rufitermina Hampson 1926
Anoba sinuata (Fabricius 1775)
Anoba socotrensis Hampson 1926
Anoba subatriplaga D. S. Fletcher & Viette 1955
Anoba suffusa Hampson 1924
Anoba tessellata (Moore 1867)
Anoba triangularis (Warnecke 1938)
Anoba trigonoides Walker, 1858
Anoba trigonosema (Hampson 1916)
Anoba turlini Viette 1970
Anoba uncifera Hampson 1926
Anoba viossati Viette 1970

References

Anobinae
Noctuoidea genera